The Port Royal School is a historic South Carolina school building. It is located at 1214 Paris Avenue in the town of Port Royal.  Its original main block is a two-story Colonial Revival structure designed by Wilson and Sompayrac and built in 1911.  In 1954 a single-story brick Modern addition was added to the north of this building; it was designed by William Harleston of Halsey & Cummings.  A second addition was made in 2002, further extending the 1954 building to the north.  The building is believed to be the second-oldest active elementary school building in the state.  It also contributed to the area's checkered history of the provision of so-called "separate but equal" educational facilities for whites and African Americans: the 1954 addition occurred at a time when the last elementary school for African Americans in Port Royal was closed, requiring the transportation of those students to Beaufort.  The Port Royal School remained whites-only until 1964.

The school was listed in the National Register of Historic Places in 2014.

See also
National Register of Historic Places listings in Beaufort County, South Carolina

References

School buildings on the National Register of Historic Places in South Carolina
School buildings completed in 1911
Schools in Beaufort County, South Carolina
National Register of Historic Places in Beaufort County, South Carolina
Anti-black racism in the United States
History of racial segregation in the United States
Discrimination in the United States
School segregation in the United States
History of racism in South Carolina
1911 establishments in South Carolina